Danashiri (died 1335) was an empress consort of the Yuan dynasty, married to Toghon Temür.

She was the daughter of El Temür, the prime minister during the first years of her husband's name. She had one son, Maha, but he died because of Measles when he was still an infant. She came to be in conflict with the emperor for his infatuation with his concubine, Lady Ki, whom she often ordered to be beaten.

Danashiri was implicated in the failed rebellion of her brother, whom she attempted to protect from being executed. She was exiled to Hefei for trying to defend her brother and later poisoned.

In popular culture
 Portrayed by Baek Jin-hee in 2013 television series Empress Ki.

Notes

Year of birth missing
1335 deaths
14th-century women
Yuan dynasty empresses
14th-century executions